"Gotta Let You Go" is a 1994 song by American freestyle and house music singer Dominica. It was a big hit in clubs and reached number 34 in the Netherlands and number 81 in Germany. In 2015, Irish electronic music duo Bicep released a remix of the track.

Critical reception
Larry Flick from Billboard wrote, "It was bound to happen. The success of "Show Me Love" by Robin S. has triggered a flurry of similar-sounding tracks. This is the best of the bunch, thanks mostly to Dominica's easygoing performance and producer/songwriter Mohammed Moretta's chantable hooks. Go for the dance/club version for a lighter, more NRGetic vibe." Maria Jimenez from Music & Media noted that it is "burning up dancefloors on both sides of the ocean. This is delicious house with a catchy hookline". A reviewer from Music Week rated it four out of five, adding, "It's got punch, panache and the potential to become a big UK favourite, too." James Hyman from the magazine's RM Dance Update wrote, "The garage-flavoured track in radio edit form is very commercial, like a cross between Deee-Lite and N-Joi's 'Anthem'. Having already dented the Dutch national charts, with the right push this could do the same in the UK." 

Another editor, Brad Beatnik gave it five out of five, commenting, "That infectious 'I gotta let you go, no more sleepless nights' vocal hook (someone please put me out of my frustration and tell me where it's from!) is put to devastating effect on this soon-to-be classic house cut licensed from Holland's Outland label. The piano stabs and thumping beats are currently pounding floors up and down the UK and the corking mixes by DJ Theor & Jaimy, Hyper Go-Go, Electroset and Lolly will only widen its appeal. It's got anthem written all over it." James Hamilton deemed it a "nasally plaintive Florida girl's maddeningly infectious jiggler with a naggingly familiar lilt". Wendi Cermak from The Network Forty stated that "this is an excellent dance number".

Impact and legacy
British electronic dance and clubbing magazine Mixmag included the song in their list of 'The 30 best vocal house anthems ever' in 2018, writing, "Way before Bicep turned Dominica’s ‘Gotta Let You Go’ into 2015’s most rinsed track of the year, 20 years earlier the original cut was a certified club smash. Its appeal is easy to see as well. It manages to blend slightly cheesy pop sensibility with a weighty kick and a dancefloor attitude. All this fire packed into one track is one thing but that’s before we’ve even go to the reason for the song’s inclusion in this list, the vocal. Dominica croons about having to break things off with her man. She doesn’t want anymore sleepless nights and she needs someone to treat her right. She just wants someone to show her love and to be there for her, she’s not going to have heart broken anymore. This is the ultimate empowerment anthem and it’s an absolute blinder. Dominica, we hope you found your man because this track has found its way into the hearts of millions."

Track listing

Charts

Weekly charts

Year-end charts

References

External links
 Dominica on Discogs

1994 singles
House music songs
Eurodance songs
1994 songs